"The Rebel – Johnny Yuma" is the theme song for the ABC-TV series The Rebel. It was written by Richard Markowitz (music) and Andrew J. Fenady (lyrics) and recorded by Johnny Cash.

The song was released as a single by Columbia Records (Columbia 4-41995, with "Forty Shades of Green" on the opposite side) in April 1961.

Background

Reception 
The song is listed as one of "Classic Non-Hot 100 Songs" in Joel Whitburn's book Joel Whitburn's Top Pop Singles 1955–2006.

Charts

References 

Johnny Cash songs
1961 singles
Songs with music by Richard Markowitz
Columbia Records singles
1961 songs